As Nasty as They Wanna Be is the third album by Miami bass group 2 Live Crew. It was released on February 7, 1989 and became the group's largest seller, being certified platinum by the Recording Industry Association of America. In 1990, the United States District Court for the Southern District of Florida ruled that the album was legally obscene; this ruling was later overturned by the Eleventh Circuit. It is the first album in history to be deemed legally obscene.

It would also be the final album to be released under the Skyywalker Records label. Following a successful lawsuit against Luther Campbell and Skyywalker Records by Star Wars creator and director George Lucas, the company was forced to change its name to Luke Records.

The album is broken down track-by-track by Luke and Mr. Mixx in Brian Coleman's book Check the Technique.

In 2010, the album cover and imagery of the record were used in the music video of the song "The Rabbit" by Swedish band Miike Snow.

Obscenity trial 

Federal district judge Jose Gonzalez ruled that the album was obscene, making it illegal in certain counties of Florida. Subsequently, on June 9, 1990, three band members were arrested, and their album seized, when they performed some tracks at a local sex club, in Broward County, Florida. In the "media circus" attendant on these events, only the Washington City Paper, Tipper Gore's Parents Music Resource Center and The Nation magazine published the offending lyrics. Christopher Hitchens, in a column on the last of these, citing the admonition on the cover of the album—"If you don't like the record, you can kiss our mother fuckin' ass"—commented,

Precisely. It's obvious to this reviewer that the Crew should be left alone, and that their foulmouthed attitude toward the gentler sex is a good-sounding excuse for a youth-hating and surreptitiously bigoted prosecution. I don't know the private thoughts of Sheriff Nick Navarro of Broward County, but I doubt they are worth a rat's behind and see no reason why he should sublimate his own vagina-dreading disorders in this expensive and undemocratic fashion. The same applies to the preposterous Judge Jose Gonzalez Jr., who in ruling on Sheriff Navarro's raid opined that the music appeals to "the loins, not to the intellect." In fact, I think they are a pair of racist shitheads who should be told to fuck right off.

During the 1990 Sound+Vision Tour in Philadelphia David Bowie stopped his performance in the middle of the song "Young Americans" to speak out against music censorship, specifically due to the controversy over 2 Live Crew's album As Nasty as They Wanna Be, saying "I've been listening to the album by 2 Live Crew. It's not the best album that's ever been made, but when I heard they banned it, I went out and bought it. Freedom of thought, freedom of speech – it's one of the most important things we have."

An obscenity trial followed, in which Henry Louis Gates, Jr., addressed the court on behalf of the defendants, all of whom were eventually acquitted.

Track listing

Personnel
2 Live Crew – producer
Jimmy Magnoli – guitar
Mr. Mixx – vocals, producer, performer, mixing
Ted Stein – engineer, mixing
Ron Taylor – engineer, mixing
Chris Murphy – engineer

As Clean as They Wanna Be

As Clean as They Wanna Be is the clean version of 2 Live Crew's third album. The album contains a disclaimer that "This album does not contain explicit lyrics". The album had notably worse sales than the explicit version. However, it does contain "Pretty Woman", which is not on the explicit version. The song – a parody of the Roy Orbison hit "Oh, Pretty Woman" – resulted in a Supreme Court case, Campbell v. Acuff-Rose Music, Inc., which established that a commercial parody can qualify as fair use. Despite the sticker on the album cover claiming "This album does not contain explicit lyrics", the song "Break It on Down" appears in its original, explicit form. Additionally, the song "City of Boom" (which is exclusive to the clean version) contains several explicit lyrics.

Track listing

Personnel
Mr. Mixx – vocals, producer, mixing
Ted Stein – engineer, mixing
Ron Taylor – engineer, mixing
Milton Mizell – coordination
Linda Fine – coordination
Mac Hartshorn – photography
Mike Holland, aka Mike Bizzo – H.N.I.C.
Luther Campbell – producer, executive producer
Nic Stone, aka Spoon 56 – Mocha Thunder Generation
Debbie Bennett – coordination
Mike Fuller – mastering

Charts

Weekly charts

Year-end charts

Certifications

References 
 Hitchens, Christopher. "Minority Report." The Nation, July 30, 1990: 120.
 MacInnes, Paul. "The 2 Live Crew are arrested." The Guardian. June 13, 2011. (accessed June 9, 2012).

External links

1989 albums
2 Live Crew albums
Works subject to a lawsuit
Obscenity controversies in music
Luke Records albums
Atlantic Records albums